The General Nursing Council for England and Wales  was established by the Nurses Registration Act 1919 to administer the register of nurses.  It was responsible for deciding the rules for admission to the register. 

There were nine lay members and sixteen nurse members. 2 lay members were appointed by the Privy Council, 2 by the Board of Education and 5 by the Minister of Health.  The nurses were initially appointed by the Minister. 11 were matrons or former matrons. Only two were from Workhouse infirmaries. Four or five were members of the Royal British Nurses' Association, including Mrs Ethel Bedford-Fenwick and 9 from the College of Nursing, Including Alicia Lloyd-Still, matron of St. Thomas' Hospital. 

It was decided that practicing nurses could be admitted to the register, which was opened in November 1921, if they had at least one year's training, and that they must apply by 14 July 1923. 3235 applications were received in the first four months. Only 984 were approved because Mrs Bedford-Fenwick insisted on examining every case.  16 members of the Council resigned.  The Minister had to intervene.  

In 1922 elections were held for the nursing places on the council. 12,000 registered nurses were eligible to vote. 11 were elected by the general nurses (6 of these had to be matrons) and 5 from the supplementary registers for mental health nursing, paediatric nursing and male nurses. Mrs Bedford-Fenwick lost her seat.  Sir Wilmot Herringham was appointed Chairman.

In June 1923, as the deadline for existing nurses to register approached, the House of Commons agreed a rule change proposed by William Chapple which permitted applicants to the general register to be admitted if they had worked as a nurse for at least three years before 1 November 1919. 40,451 applications were received.

In 1925 the first state examination was held and 4,005 nurses were admitted to the register by passing it.

See also Nursing and Midwifery Council

References

Nursing education in the United Kingdom
Nursing organisations in the United Kingdom